Hidden Moon is a 2012 Mexican mystery romantic drama film directed by José Pepe Bojórquez and starring Wes Bentley, Ana Serradilla, Osvaldo de León and Linda Gray.

Cast
Ana Serradilla as Miranda Rios
Johnathon Schaech as William Brighton
Linda Gray as Eva Brighton
Osvaldo de León as Tobías
Wes Bentley as Victor Brighton
Héctor Jiménez as Beto
Alejandra Ambrosi as Camila
Angélica María as Sofia
Emily Foxler as Susan
Chandra West as Monica Brighton
Jackson Hurst as Bruce
Riley Voelkel as Christine Brighton
Alan Gutierrez as Memo
Olga Segura as Inés
Scarlett Chorvat as Natasha
Adriana Louvier as Apolonia

References

External links
 
 

2012 films
2010s Spanish-language films
Mexican mystery films
Mexican romantic drama films
Universal Pictures films
2010s English-language films
Films directed by José Pepe Bojórquez
2012 multilingual films
Mexican multilingual films
2010s Mexican films